Brent Pelham is a village and civil parish in the East Hertfordshire district, in the county of Hertfordshire, England, and situated approximately 5 miles (8 km) east of Buntingford. It is one of the three Pelhams, with Stocking Pelham and Furneux Pelham. It shares a parish council with Meesden.

The parish church of St Mary the Virgin dates from the 14th century. It contains a black marble tomb slab of the 13th century, upon which the name of legendary local dragon-slayer Piers Shonks and a date of 1086 has been added. Symbols of the Four Evangelists – angel, eagle, lion, and bull – have been carved in relief around a dragon's mouth. The church is part of a benefice with Anstey, Brent Pelham, Hormead, Meesden and Wyddial.

Near St Mary's church are ancient stocks which could accommodate up to three people. A derelict windmill survives in the village.

There is a Royal Observer Corps observer post just outside the village, but it is now in a state of disrepair. It has an Orlit, which is rare for posts in this area.

See also
 The Hundred Parishes

References

External links

Villages in Hertfordshire
Civil parishes in Hertfordshire
East Hertfordshire District